Paul Gregory MacKinnon (born November 6, 1958) is a Canadian former professional ice hockey defenceman.

MacKinnon was born in Brantford, Ontario. Selected by the Washington Capitals in the 1978 NHL Entry Draft, MacKinnon signed to play with the Winnipeg Jets of the World Hockey Association.  The Capitals reclaimed MacKinnon back prior to the 1979–80 season, where he played until the end of the 1983–84 NHL season.

External links
Profile at hockeydraftcentral.com

1958 births
Living people
Canadian ice hockey defencemen
Hershey Bears players
Peterborough Petes (ice hockey) players
Washington Capitals draft picks
Washington Capitals players
Winnipeg Jets (WHA) players
Ice hockey people from Ontario
Sportspeople from Brantford